is a Japanese idol. She has had the role of Sailor Mercury and Berthier in the Sailor Moon Musicals or Seramyu. She held the role of Mercury from 2002 to 2005, graduating from the role with the musical Shin Kaguya Shima Densetsu - Kaiteiban. She has also released several idol DVDs and appeared in various other musicals.

Musicals
Tanjou! Ankoku no Princess Black Lady (Kaiteiban) - Wakusei Nemesis no Nazo - Berthier
Mugen Gakuen - Mistress Labyrinth - Sailor Mercury
Mugen Gakuen - Mistress Labyrinth (Kaiteiban) - Sailor Mercury
Starlights - Ryuusei Densetsu - Sailor Mercury
Kakyuu-Ouhi Kourin - The Second Stage Final - Sailor Mercury
Shin Kaguya Shima Densetsu - Sailor Mercury
Shin Kaguya Shima Densetsu (Kaiteiban) - Marinamoon Final - Sailor Mercury

References

1986 births
Living people
Japanese gravure models
Japanese actresses
Japanese idols